Han Joo-wan (born January 10, 1984) is a South Korean actor. He began his acting career in indie short films such as Leesong Hee-il's queer Suddenly, Last Summer and Lee Sang-woo's Exit (the latter from Jeonju International Film Festival's annual Short! Short! Short! omnibus project). Han rose to mainstream popularity in 2013 in the highly rated ensemble TV drama Wang's Family, which led to him being cast in 2014 period drama Gunman in Joseon.

Filmography

Film

Television series

Discography

Awards and nominations

References

External links

1984 births
Living people
21st-century South Korean male actors
South Korean male film actors
South Korean male television actors
Seoul Institute of the Arts alumni
People from Seoul